The 1967–68 Kentucky Colonels season was the first season of the Colonels in the newly created American Basketball Association. The team was created on March 6, 1967, with Don Regan being awarded the team for $30,000. Later in the year, Joseph Gregory, Mamie Gregory and William C. Boone became owners.

The Colonels finished tied for fourth place in the ABA's Eastern Division with the New Jersey Americans, and a one-game playoff was to be played on March 23, the day after the Colonels had won the final game of the season over the Indiana Pacers 119–106. However, the conditions of the arena where the game was to be taken place were deemed to be in poor condition. The Colonels refused to play, and ABA Commissioner George Mikan ruled a forfeit in favor of the Colonels. In the Eastern Division Semifinals, they lost to the Minnesota Muskies 3 games to 2.

Roster
 50 Howard Bayne – Power forward
 52 Orbie Bowling – Center
 34 Bill Bradley – Shooting guard
 24 Jim Caldwell – Center
 35 Darel Carrier – Shooting guard
 40 Larry Conley – Shooting guard
 10 Louie Dampier – Point guard
 32 David Gaines – Shooting guard
 24 Stew Johnson – Power forward
 22 Goose Ligon – Power forward
 25 Randolph Mahaffey – Small forward
 44 Cotton Nash – Small forward
 45 Bobby Rascoe – Small forward
 14/41 Kendall Rhine – Center
 42 Joe Roberts – Small forward
 32 Rubin Russell – Shooting guard
 14 George Sutor – Center
 54 Tommy Woods – Power forward

Final standings

Eastern Division

Record vs. opponents

Playoffs
Eastern Division Semifinals

Colonels lose series, 3–2

Awards and honors
1968 ABA All-Star Game selections (game played on January 9, 1968)
 Louie Dampier
 Darel Carrier
 Randolph Mahaffey
All-ABA Second Team selection
 Louie Dampier
All-ABA Rookie Team selection
 Louie Dampier

References

 Colonels on Basketball Reference

External links
 RememberTheABA.com 1967-68 regular season and playoff results
 RememberTheABA.com Kentucky Colonels page

Kentucky Colonels seasons
Kentucky
Kentucky Colonels, 1967-68
Kentucky Colonels, 1967-68